Dobrucowa  is a village in the administrative district of Gmina Tarnowiec, within Jasło County, Subcarpathian Voivodeship, in south-eastern Poland.

World War II
Some two thousand Polish Jews were murdered in mass executions at the Dobrucowa Forest in the fall and winter of 1943, on the orders of SS-Hauptsturmführer Amon Goeth from Płaszów. They were transported there from the Szebnie concentration camp during camp's murderous liquidation.

References

Dobrucowa
Holocaust locations in Poland